Doug or Douglas Lowe may refer to:
 Douglas Lowe (athlete) (1902–1981), British Olympic athlete
 Douglas Lowe (RAF officer) (1922–2018), World War II pilot and Royal Air Force commander
 Doug Lowe (Australian politician) (born 1942), former Tasmanian premier